Ruapehu District is a territorial authority in the centre of New Zealand's North Island.

Features
The district is landlocked, and contains the western half of the Tongariro National Park, including Mount Ruapehu and the western sides of Mount Ngauruhoe and Mount Tongariro, as well as part of the Whanganui National Park. The district is also home to the world-famous Raurimu Spiral on the North Island Main Trunk railway line.

The tourist towns of Raetihi, Whakapapa Village, National Park and Ohakune are located near Mount Ruapehu in the south east of the district. Waiouru, with an elevation of 815 metres, is in the extreme south east of the district and houses the large Waiouru Army Camp. The southern section of the infamous Desert Road section of State Highway 1 runs through the east of the district, from Waiouru to Rangipo.

Demographics

Ruapehu District had a population of 12,309 at the 2018 New Zealand census, an increase of 465 people (3.9%) since the 2013 census, and a decrease of 1,263 people (−9.3%) since the 2006 census. There were 4,617 households. There were 6,288 males and 6,021 females, giving a sex ratio of 1.04 males per female. The median age was 39.0 years (compared with 37.4 years nationally), with 2,715 people (22.1%) aged under 15 years, 2,208 (17.9%) aged 15 to 29, 5,454 (44.3%) aged 30 to 64, and 1,932 (15.7%) aged 65 or older.

Ethnicities were 68.8% European/Pākehā, 43.4% Māori, 2.8% Pacific peoples, 3.4% Asian, and 1.7% other ethnicities. People may identify with more than one ethnicity.

The percentage of people born overseas was 10.4, compared with 27.1% nationally.

Although some people objected to giving their religion, 51.1% had no religion, 33.0% were Christian, 0.7% were Hindu, 0.1% were Muslim, 0.5% were Buddhist and 6.5% had other religions.

Of those at least 15 years old, 1,026 (10.7%) people had a bachelor or higher degree, and 2,466 (25.7%) people had no formal qualifications. The median income was $25,300, compared with $31,800 nationally. 948 people (9.9%) earned over $70,000 compared to 17.2% nationally. The employment status of those at least 15 was that 4,719 (49.2%) people were employed full-time, 1,431 (14.9%) were part-time, and 483 (5.0%) were unemployed.

Governmental

Ruapehu District Council
The Ruapehu District Council was established by the 1989 local government reforms. It was formed from the Taumarunui Borough Council, Taumarunui County Council, Waimarino District Council and parts of the Rangitikei County, Taupo District, Waitomo District and Stratford District councils.

The council is made up of 12 elected councillors including a mayor and deputy mayor. The district is also served by 2 Community Boards and a Ward Committee with the same functions and powers as the Community Boards.

Mayor
The current mayor of the Ruapehu District is Weston Kirton, the deputy mayor is Vivienne Hoeta.

Council
 Taumarunui-Ohura♮ Community Board; 5 elected community representatives and 1 appointed Councillor.
 Waimarino-Waiouru Community Board; 5 elected community representatives and 1 appointed Councillor.
 Owhango-National Park Community Board; 5 elected community representatives and 1 appointed Councilor.

Elected Representatives - Ruapehu District Council</ref>

References

External links

Ruapehu District Council
Map of the District
Map of boundaries for all regional, district and city councils in New Zealand - north, south
Ruapehu Districts RTO 'Visit Ruapehu'